The Indian Kiosk is located at Frogmore, in the Home Park of Windsor Castle, in Berkshire, England. The kiosk comes from India and was originally designed for the Qaisar Bagh, a palace complex in the city of Lucknow. The palace was looted by British soldiers following the suppression of the Indian Rebellion of 1857 and the kiosk was brought to England by Charles Canning, Governor-General of India, and presented to Queen Victoria. The Queen sited it in her private gardens at Frogmore, near the mausoleum to her mother. It is a Grade II listed structure.

History
Wajid Ali Shah (1832-1887), the last Nawab of Awadh, built the Qaisar Bagh palace complex in his capital city, Lucknow, between 1847 and 1856. It comprised a series of courts, with pools and gardens, surrounding the central palace. The complex was designed in the Mughal style and the gardens were decorated with “many small marble pavilions and kiosks”. Ali Shah was deposed by the British in 1856, and the state of Awadh annexed by the British East India Company. This action caused enormous resentment and the population of Lucknow was enthusiastic in support of the Indian Rebellion which broke out the following year. The siege of the Lucknow Residency lasted almost six months, and the subsequent retaking of the city in March 1858 saw the looting and destruction of the Qaisar Bagh. Charles Canning selected the kiosk as a tribute to Queen Victoria and had it shipped to England in 1858.

Frogmore House and its estate were bought by George III for his wife Queen Charlotte in 1792, although the land had formed part of the Windsor royal hunting ground since the reign of Henry VIII. Charlotte engaged James Wyatt to redesign the house and sought the advice of her Vice-Chamberlain, William Price, regarding the redevelopment of the grounds. Price's brother Uvedale, an early exponent of the Picturesque, clearly influenced the design. In 1840, Frogmore was inherited by the Duchess of Kent and, following her death in 1861, by her daughter, Queen Victoria. The estate became a favoured, almost sacred, retreat; after burying her mother in a mausoleum overlooking the lake, the Queen commissioned  another, the Royal Mausoleum, for her husband Albert, Prince Consort and for herself, after Albert's death in 1861.

During her long widowhood, when she rarely visited London, Victoria spent much of her time at Windsor and at Frogmore. She undertook further building work in the gardens, employing Samuel Sanders Teulon to construct a teahouse, and engaging Thomas Willement to redecorate the Gothic Ruin, originally designed by Wyatt and Princess Elizabeth. In this setting Victoria placed the Indian Kiosk, and in her later years would often undertake correspondence in a tent set up nearby, attended by her Indian servant Abdul Karim.

Architecture and description
The kiosk is constructed entirely in marble with open arches and an onion dome roof. Geoffrey Tyack, Simon Bradley and Nikolaus Pevsner, in their Berkshire volume of the Buildings of England series, describe it as a “pretty, octagonal domed pavilion of white marble”. The garden historian George Plumptre notes its “exquisite oriental symmetry”. The kiosk is a Grade II listed structure. Teulon's Teahouse also has a Grade II listing while James Wyatt's nearby Gothic Ruin is designated Grade II*.

Public access
Frogmore Gardens are opened to the public on a limited number of days each year, under the National Garden Scheme.

Footnotes

References

Sources

External links

 Frogmore House and Gardens entry on the Royal Collection Trust website

Grade II listed monuments and memorials
Monuments and memorials in Berkshire
Buildings and structures in Windsor Great Park
Home Park, Windsor
Indian architectural history